Salzburg Zoo (German: Zoo Salzburg), also referred to as Tiergarten Hellbrunn, is a zoo in Salzburg, Salzburgerland, Austria.

Animals
It is 14 hectares in size, and has 1500 animals from 150 species.

Location
It is located in the south of the city, in Anifer Street, in the Anif District.

References

External links

 Zoo Salzburg
 Salzburg Tourist Office –  salzburg city tourist board website.

Zoo
Tourist attractions in Salzburg
Zoos in Austria
Zoos established in 1961